Karavilagenin E is a chemical compound found in the Balsam apple vine (Momordica balsamina).  It is a cucurbitane-type triterpenoid, related to cucurbitacin.

Karavilagenin E is soluble in methanol and ethyl acetate but insoluble in n-hexane.

See also 
 Balsaminapentaol
 Balsaminol A
 Balsaminol B
 Cucurbalsaminol A
 Cucurbalsaminol B

References 

Triterpenes
Diols